Khorram Chammaz (also Romanized as Khorram Chammāz and Khorram Chamāz) is a village in Peyrajeh Rural District, in the Central District of Neka County, Mazandaran Province, Iran. At the 2006 census, its population was 141, in 51 families.

References 

Populated places in Neka County